Cantemir is a town in Moldova. It is the administrative center of Cantemir District.

References

External links
Cantemir County Businesses
View at Terraserver

Cantemir District
Cities and towns in Moldova